= Manhattan Movie Magazine =

- Website type: Entertainment news and interviews
- Available in: English
- Creator: Steve Eliau
- Website: www.manhattanmoviemag.com
- Commercial: Domestic Limited Liability Company
- Launched: 2007
- Current status: Inactive

Manhattan Movie Magazine or MMM is an American online film magazine that "cover[s] all things film- with a NY twist." It launched at the Tribeca Film Festival in 2007. Its editor-in-chief is Steve Eliau, while writer Marlow Stern has also served as an editor since its founding. After 2009, the magazine's online presence declined significantly with the final publication reportedly released in 2010.
